Jerzens is a municipality and a village in the district of Imst (district) and is located 8 km south of Imst at the Pitze River in the valley with the same name. Settlement of the area began around 600. The village was mentioned in a register in 1313 for the first time. Jerzens has 1008 inhabitants and its main source of income is agriculture and tourism.

Population

Notable people
Wolfgang Auderer - professional freestyle skier

References

External links
Homepage

Cities and towns in Imst District